Osvaldo Cruz Futebol Clube, commonly known as Osvaldo Cruz, is a Brazilian football club based in Osvaldo Cruz, São Paulo that competes in the Campeonato Paulista Segunda Divisão, the fourth tier of the São Paulo state football league.

History
The club was founded on February 17, 2004. Osvaldo Cruz finished in the second position in the Campeonato Paulista Segunda Divisão in 2005, losing the competition to São Carlos.

Stadium
Osvaldo Cruz Futebol Clube play their home games at Estádio Breno Ribeiro do Val, nicknamed Brenão. The stadium has a maximum capacity of 13,478 people.

References

Association football clubs established in 2004
Football clubs in São Paulo (state)
2004 establishments in Brazil